The Campaign for Real Education (CRE) is a right-wing  pressure group and non-profit organisation in the United Kingdom that advocates for traditional education, greater parental choice in schooling, and less state regulation of subjects that children study.

History
The CRE was established in 1987 by a group of 14 parents and teachers, although it was effectively a one-man organisation led by Nick Seaton, who ran it from a bedroom in his home near York. It gained national attention after intervening in a dispute at Lewes Priory School over whether pupils should sit O Levels or GCSEs. Two teachers who pressed for students to sit the O Level were redeployed, with one of them, Chris McGovern, later becoming a headteacher in the independent sector and the CRE's chairman.

Aims
The group campaigns to "press for higher standards and more parental choice in  state education." It opposes the teaching of sociology and politics. It has been critical of anti-racism and anti-sexism campaigns. In 2021, the group said a mock trial held by Welsh schoolchildren about a Conservative MP's ancestral links to the slave trade was "brainwashing".

See also
Campaign for State Education – seeks to promote comprehensive schools.

References

External links
Official website

Educational organisations based in the United Kingdom
Educational organisations based in London
Organizations established in 1987
Education reform
Oversight and watchdog organizations
Political advocacy groups in the United Kingdom
1987 establishments in the United Kingdom